Daniel Go (born March 23, 1966) is a Filipino architect of Chinese descent. Go founded Daniel C. Go Architecture Design, and ADGO Architecture and Design Inc., and is its principal architect. His buildings include the CCF Center in Pasig, and BTTC Centre – the first LEED certified building in San Juan in the Philippines – aside from other residential and commercial establishment projects. He and his wife also manage a printing and packaging business among other business endeavors. In 2006 he became a Fellow at the United Architects of the Philippines (UAP), and became a registered APEC Architect in 2008 and a registered ASEAN Architect in 2015.

Personal life
Born on March 23, 1966, Daniel Chu Go is the eldest of five sons of Chinese parents, with a businessman father who eventually became a pastor. The Go family is based in Quezon City, Philippines, and runs a processed and preserved food manufacturing business specializing in Chinese delicacies – started by his grandfather in the 1940s and still popular today among the Chinese community.

His family's Chinese food business manufactures the famous Fat & Thin champoy candy, which had his father's cartoons and caricatures imprinted on the wrapper. And Go spent most of his time watching his father work, eventually acquiring the same love for the art.

As a young boy, Daniel Go showed considerable interest and skill in the visual arts during summer art classes and school competitions when he attended primary school at Grace Christian High School, from 1973 to 1979, and at Jubilee Christian Academy – both in Quezon City – from 1979 to 1984 for his secondary education.

He decided to pursue his talent for drawings and illustrations by taking up Bachelor of Science in Architecture at the College of Architecture and Fine Arts of the University of Santo Tomas in Manila, where he graduated cum laude from the graduating class of 1989.

Daniel Go is married, and a father to four children – three sons and one daughter.

As a diversion from his work Go also has a passion for restoring cars, and considers running and golf as his two main sports. He spends a lot of his leisure time with his family and travels a lot to learn the arts from different cultures.

Career
After graduating in 1989, Go briefly worked as an apprentice to Architect Jose Siao Ling where he was designated to work as a draftsman. Not long after his apprenticeship with Architect Jose Siao Ling, he took up and passed his Architect Licensure Examination in 1991 where he then preceded to practice architecture professionally.

In 1996, Go established his own firm named Daniel C. Go & Associates. Then in 2006, he was conferred and elevated to the College of Fellows in the Field and Category of Design of the United Architects of the Philippines (UAP) During the same year, he established ADGO Architecture and Designs Inc., this time tackling bigger projects alongside a pool of younger architects. In 2008, Go was conferred as an APEC (Asia-Pacific Economic Cooperation) Architect.

The Christ’s Commission Fellowship Worship and Training Center (known as CCF Center) – completed in 2013 – was Go’s first big project because during that time, Go had not designed anything of this magnitude, and designing and erecting this project took him seven years. The CCF Center is the international headquarters of the non-denominational megachurch called Christ's Commission Fellowship (CCF).

Aside from the CCF Center, another major project of Architect Go is the BTTC Centre in Greenhills, San Juan. Completed in 2013, the BTTC Centre is a LEED Gold certified building for Leadership in Energy and Environmental design from the US Green Building Council (USGBC). It is the first LEED Certified building in San Juan, and the first LEED Certified project of Architect Go.

In addition to these major projects, Architect Go has developed projects raging from residential spaces, condominiums, townhouse units, institutional buildings, warehouse compounds, commercial and office buildings, industrial complexes and hotels.

Architect Daniel Go’s design philosophy is centered on his own brand of classicism, which he defines as both timeless and inspirational. He fuses classical and modern styles, creating sleek and modern living spaces more for practicality.

Notable works
 Christ’s Commission Fellowship Worship and Training Center – Ortigas Avenue corner C-5 Road, Pasig (Completed 2013)
 BTTC Centre (Green Building project) – Ortigas Avenue corner Roosevelt St. San Juan – (Completed 2012)
 CEDAR Executive Building III – Timog Ave. corner Scout Tobias, Diliman, Quezon City (Completed 2012)
 9-Storey Office Building – Jose Abad Santos St., San Juan (Completed 2014)
 Commodity Quest Warehouse Compound – Sumulong Highway, Antipolo (Completed 2014)
 Sun Valley Golf Club Condominium – Inarawan, Antipolo (Completed 2009)
 Unimagma Philippines Industrial Building, Bo. Ganado, LIIP, Biñan, Laguna (Completed 2012)
 Diversys Spectrum Corporate Office & Manufacturing Plant – Laguna Technopark Phase II, Biñan, Laguna (Completed 2006)

Recognitions and distinctions
 Conferred and elevated to the College of Fellows in the Field and Category of Design of the United Architects of the Philippines (UAP)

References

External links
 Daniel Go's official profile at ADGO Architecture and Design Inc.

Filipino architects
21st-century Filipino architects
University of Santo Tomas alumni
Filipino people of Chinese descent
People from Quezon City
1966 births
Living people